The European Chalcolithic, the Chalcolithic (also Eneolithic, Copper Age) period of Prehistoric Europe, lasted roughly from 5000 to 2000 BC, developing from the preceding Neolithic period and followed by the Bronze Age.

It was a period of Megalithic culture, the appearance of the first significant economic stratification, and probably the earliest presence of Indo-European speakers.

The economy of the Chalcolithic, even in the regions where copper was not yet used, was no longer that of peasant communities and tribes: some materials began to be produced in specific locations and distributed to wide regions. Mining of metal and stone was particularly developed in some areas, along with the processing of those materials into valuable goods.

Ancient Chalcolithic

From c. 5000 BC to 3000 BC, copper started being used in the Balkans, Eastern Europe, and Central Europe. From c. 3500 onwards, there was an influx of people into Eastern Europe from the area east of the Volga (Yamnaya culture), creating a plural complex known as Sredny Stog culture. This culture replaced the Dnieper-Donets culture, and migrated northwest to the Baltic and Denmark, where they mixed with natives (TRBK A and C). This may be correlated with the spread of Indo-European languages, known as the Kurgan hypothesis. Near the end of the period, another branch left many traces in the lower Danube area (culture of Cernavodă culture I), in what seems to have been another invasion.

Meanwhile, the Danubian Lengyel culture absorbed its northern neighbours of the Czech Republic and Poland over a number of centuries, only to recede in the second half of the period. In Bulgaria and Wallachia (Southern Romania), the Boian-Marica culture evolved into a monarchy with a clearly royal cemetery near the coast of the Black Sea. This model seems to have been copied later in the Tiszan region with the culture of Bodrogkeresztur. Labour specialization, economic stratification and possibly the risk of invasion may have been the reasons behind this development. The influx of early Troy (Troy I) is clear in both the expansion of metallurgy and social organization.

In the western Danubian region (the Rhine and Seine basins) the culture of Michelsberg displaced its predecessor, Rössen. Meanwhile, in the Mediterranean basin, several cultures (most notably Chassey in SE France and La Lagozza in northern Italy) converged into a functional union, of which the most significant characteristic was the distribution network of honey-coloured flint. Despite this unity, the signs of conflicts are clear, as many skeletons show violent injuries. This was the time and area where Ötzi, a man whose well-preserved body was found in the Alps, lived. Another significant development of this period was the Megalithic phenomenon spreading to most places of the Atlantic region, bringing with it agriculture to some underdeveloped regions existing there.

Middle Chalcolithic

This period extends along the first half of the 3rd millennium BC. Most significant is the reorganization of the Danubians into the powerful Baden culture, which extended more or less to what would be the Austro-Hungarian Empire in recent times. The rest of the Balkans was profoundly restructured after the invasions of the previous period but, with the exception of the Coțofeni culture in a mountainous region, none of them show any eastern (or presumably Indo-European) traits. The new Ezero culture, in Bulgaria, had the first traits of pseudo-bronze (an alloy of copper with arsenic); as did the first significant Aegean group: the Cycladic culture after circa 2800 BC.

In the North, the supposedly Indo-European groups seemed to recede temporarily, suffering a strong cultural danubianization. In the East, the peoples of beyond the Volga (Yamnaya culture), surely eastern Indo-Europeans, ancestors of Iranians, took over southern Russia and Ukraine. In the West the only sign of unity comes from the Megalithic super-culture, which extended from southern Sweden to southern Spain, including large parts of southern Germany. But the Mediterranean and Danubian groupings of the previous period appear to have been fragmented into many smaller pieces, some of them apparently backward in technological matters. From circa 2800 BC, the Danubian Seine-Oise-Marne culture pushed directly or indirectly southwards, destroying most of the rich Megalithic culture of western France.

After c. 2600 several phenomena prefigured the changes of the upcoming period. Large towns with stone walls appeared in two different areas of the Iberian Peninsula: one in the Portuguese region of Estremadura (culture of Vila Nova de São Pedro), strongly embedded in the Atlantic Megalithic culture; the other near Almería (SE Spain), centred on the large town of Los Millares, of Mediterranean character, probably affected by eastern cultural influxes (tholoi). Despite the many differences the two civilizations seemed to be in friendly contact and to have productive exchanges. In the area of Dordogne (Aquitaine, France), a new unexpected culture of bowmen appeared, the culture of Artenac, which would soon take control of western and even northern France and Belgium. In Poland and nearby regions, the putative Indo-Europeans reorganized and consolidated again with the culture of the Globular Amphoras. Nevertheless, the influence of many centuries in direct contact with the still-powerful Danubian peoples had greatly modified their culture.

Late Chalcolithic

This period extended from c. 2500 BC to c. 1800 or 1700 BC (depending on the region). The dates are general for the whole of Europe, and the Aegean area was already fully in the Bronze Age. Circa 2500 BC the new Catacomb culture (proto-Cimmerians?), whose origins are obscure but who were also Indo-Europeans, displaced the Yamnaya peoples in the regions north and east of the Black Sea, confining them to their original area east of the Volga. Some of these infiltrated Poland and may have played a significant but unclear role in the transformation of the culture of the Globular Amphorae into the new Corded Ware culture. In Britain, copper was used between the 25th and 22nd centuries BC, but some archaeologists do not recognise a British Chalcolithic because production and use was on a small scale.

Around 2400 BC. this people of the Corded Ware replaced their predecessors and expanded to Danubian and Nordic areas of western Germany. One related branch invaded Denmark and southern Sweden (Single Grave culture), while the mid-Danubian basin, though showing more continuity, also displayed clear traits of new Indo-European elites (Vučedol culture). Simultaneously, in the west, the Artenac peoples reached Belgium. With the partial exception of Vučedol, the Danubian cultures, so buoyant just a few centuries ago, were wiped off the map of Europe. The rest of the period was the story of a mysterious phenomenon: the Beaker people. This group seems to have been of mercantile character and preferred being buried according to a very specific, almost invariable, ritual. Nevertheless, out of their original area of western Central Europe, they appeared only inside local cultures, so they never invaded and assimilated but rather went to live among those peoples, keeping their way of life.

The rest of the continent remained mostly unchanged and in apparent peace. From c. 2300 BC the first Beaker Pottery appeared in Bohemia and expanded in many directions, but particularly westward, along the Rhone and the sea shores, reaching the culture of Vila Nova (Portugal) and Catalonia (Spain) as its limit. Simultaneously but unrelatedly, c. 2200 BC in the Aegean region, the Cycladic culture decayed, being substituted by the new palatine phase of the Minoan culture of Crete.

The second phase of Beaker Pottery, from c. 2100 BC onwards, was marked by the displacement of the centre of this phenomenon to Portugal, inside the culture of Vila Nova. This new centre's influence reached to all southern and western France but was absent in southern and western Iberia, with the notable exception of Los Millares. After c. 1900 BC, the centre of the Beaker Pottery returned to Bohemia, while in Iberia there was a decentralization of the phenomenon, with centres in Portugal but also in Los Millares and Ciempozuelos.

See also
Prehistoric Europe
Bronze Age Europe
Neolithic Europe
Metallurgy during the Copper Age in Europe
Burned house horizon

References

Sources

External links

 Archeo News: Ancient civilization uncovered in Bulgaria
 Hindustan Times: World's oldest Copper Age settlement found

Prehistoric Europe